Neoephemera is a genus of large squaregill mayflies in the family Neoephemeridae first described by McDunnough (1925). and containing approximately six described species in Neoephemera.

Species
These six species belong to the genus Neoephemera:
 Neoephemera bicolor 
 Neoephemera compressa 
 Neoephemera maxima 
 Neoephemera projecta 
 Neoephemera purpurea 
 Neoephemera youngi 

An extinct species, Neoephemera antiqua, has also been assigned to the genus.  The species is known only from the type locality in the  Ypresian Klondike Mountain Formation of northeast Central Washington state.

References

Further reading

 
 
 
 
 
 

Mayflies
Mayfly genera